Abbekerk is a small city in the Dutch province of North Holland. It is a part of the municipality of Medemblik, and lies about 9 km north of Hoorn.

History 
Abbekerk was first mentioned around 1312 as Abbenkerke, and means "(private) church of Abbe (person)". Abbekerk developed as a peat excavation settlement in the 11th century. It received city rights in 1414. The city rights ended in 1795.

The Dutch Reformed church of Abbekerk is a single aisled church. The nave was built around 1500 and enlarged in 1517. It has a tower dating from 1656. The brick spire was restored in 1859.

Abbekerk was home to 422 people in 1840. In 1887, a combined railway station with Lambertschaag opened on the Hoorn to Medemblik railway line. The railway line closed in 1941. It used to be a separate municipality. In 1979, it was merged into Noorder-Koggenland. In 2007, it became part of the municipality of Medemblik.

Gallery

References

Former municipalities of North Holland
Populated places in North Holland
Medemblik